Lew M. Bowen was the first club secretary of English football club West Ham United.

Born in Swansea, Bowen was a clerk at the Thames Ironworks and Shipbuilding Company and had reported on predecessor club Thames Ironworks F.C. for the Thames Ironworks Gazette. He was installed immediately following the new club's formation in June 1900.

Bowen remained at the club as financial director after Syd King was appointed secretary during the 1901–02 season. He would also perform the role of league delegate. In 1903, Bowen was involved in an application to the Football Association for West Ham's home, the Memorial Grounds, to host an FA Cup final or semi-final. "I think that we have fairly proved the possibilities of putting a crowd of over 100,000 in the Grounds. I believe the correct figures are 133,000 allowing for 16 inches for each person", he stated in a letter to the FA.

References

Year of birth missing
Year of death missing
Sportspeople from Swansea
Welsh sportswriters
Association football journalists
West Ham United F.C. club secretaries
West Ham United F.C. directors and chairmen